Dahan may refer to:

Places
Dahan, Iran (disambiguation), places in Iran
Dahan River, a river in Taiwan

Other uses
 Dahan (surname)
 Dahan (solar term), solar term of traditional East Asian Lunisolar calendar
 Dahan (1985 film), a 1985 Bangladeshi film
 Dahan (1997 film), a 1997 Bengali film directed by Rituparno Ghosh
 Dahan (2018 film), a 2018 Bangladeshi film
 Dahan Institute of Technology, a university in Hualien County, Taiwan

See also
 Han (disambiguation)